Maastricht railway station is located in Maastricht in Limburg, Netherlands. It is the main railway station in Limburg's capital city. It is the southern terminus of the –Maastricht intercity service by NS. Additionally, Arriva and the Belgian NMBS serve the station with local trains.

History

Both lines are now (partially) closed. In 1861, the Liège-Maastricht railway connection was opened. It was not until the opening of the Maastricht–Venlo railway in 1865 that Maastricht was connected to the rest of the Netherlands.

Due to the fortified character of the town, the first railway station was in fact situated outside Maastricht, within the municipality of Meerssen. The first station was built out of wood, so that in case of attack it could quickly be demolished. The municipal borders were adjusted in 1907, making the station part of the municipality of Maastricht. The current brick building was built in 1913, designed by George Willem van Heukelom. Due to its international connection, the station housed border customs. Even though Belgian trains from Liège still terminate at Maastricht, passport and security checks have gone with the implementation of the Schengen Agreement. The former customs space is now used for small shops such as a florist, an Albert Heijn, a HEMA and snackbars.

Plans
There was a plan to reopen the line to Hasselt as a tramway. Twice an hour, a tram was to run from Maastricht station through the town centre to the nearby town of Lanaken, and further as a light rail train to Bilzen and Hasselt. The line was planned to open in 2018 but was first of all curtailed to the town centre because the bridge was too weak, then postponed until 2024, and finally cancelled in 2022.

Train services
The following train services call at this station:
 Express services:
 NS intercity: (Schagen–)Alkmaar–Amsterdam–Utrecht–Eindhoven–Maastricht
 Arriva sneltrein RE 18: Maastricht–Meerssen–Valkenburg–Heerlen–Herzogenrath–Aachen
 Arriva stoptrein S4: Maastricht Randwyck–Meerssen–Valkenburg-Heerlen
 SNCB/NMBS local 13: (Hasselt–Liers–)Liège–Visé–Maastricht

Bus services

City buses 
 1: Malberg–Brusselse Poort–Maastricht City Centre–Maastricht Central Station–Maastricht Randwyck–De Heeg
 2: Oud Caberg–Brusselse Poort–Maastricht City Centre–Maastricht Central Station–Maastricht Randwyck–De Heeg
 3: Wolder–Biesland–Jekerkwartier–Maastricht City Centre–Maastricht Central Station–Wittevrouwenveld–Nazareth
 4: Maastricht(–Pottenberg–Jekerkwartier–City Centre–Central Station–Wittevrouwenveld)–Berg en Terblijt–Valkenburg
 5: Daalhof–Mariaberg–Maastricht City Centre–Maastricht Central Station–Maastricht Randwyck–Heugem–Oost-Maarland–Eijsden
 6: Daalhof–Mariaberg–Maastricht City Centre–Maastricht Central Station–Wittevrouwenveld–Amby
 7: Malpertuis–Caberg–Maastricht City Centre–Maastricht Central Station–Maastricht City Centre–Jekerdal–Villapark
 8: Maastricht(–Boschpoort–City Centre–Central Station–Wittevrouwenveld)–Bemelen–Sibbe–Valkenburg
 9: Maastricht Central Station–Beatrixhaven–Borgharen–Itteren–Bunde

Night buses 
 N1: Malberg–Brusselse Poort–Maastricht City Centre–Maastricht Central Station–Randwyck–De Heeg
 N4: Maastricht City Centre–Scharn–Wittevrouwenveld–Berg en Terblijt–Valkenburg

Regional buses 
15: Eijsden- Maastricht
30: Sittard–Geleen–Beek–MAA–Meerssen–Maastricht
57: Maastricht–Gronsveld–Eckelrade–St. Geertruid–Mheer–Noorbeek–Heyenrath–Epen–Mechelen–Partij–Gulpen
350 (Limburgliner): Maastricht–Cadier en Keer–Margraten–Gulpen–Wahlwiller–Nijswiller–Lemiers–Vaals–Aachen
610 (school line): Simpelveld–Bocholtz–Nijswiller–Wahlwiller–Gulpen–Margraten–Cadier en Keer–Maastricht

References

External links
NS website

Railway stations in Maastricht
Railway stations opened in 1853
Railway stations on the Staatslijn E
Railway stations on the Heuvellandlijn
Rijksmonuments in Maastricht
Railway stations in the Netherlands opened in 1853